Timo Baumgartl (born 4 March 1996) is a German professional footballer who plays as centre back for Bundesliga club Union Berlin, on loan from PSV.

Club career

Stuttgart
Baumgartl made his debut on 18 December 2013 for VfB Stuttgart II in the 3. Liga against Borussia Dortmund II in a 2–1 home defeat. He played the full game as a centre back.

He made his Bundesliga debut for the first team of VfB Stuttgart on 8 November 2014 against Werder Bremen. On 26 January 2015, Baumgartl extended his contract with VfB Stuttgart until June 2018. He renewed his contract again until June 2020 on 11 August 2015. On 3 December 2017, Baumgartl signed a new five-year contract with VfB, keeping him at Stuttgart until June 2022.

PSV
On 25 July 2019, PSV Eindhoven announced the signing of Baumgartl on a five-year deal.

Union Berlin (loan)
On 1 July 2021, it was announced that Baumgartl returned to Germany to play for Union Berlin on a season-long loan deal with an option to buy. On 15 June 2022, PSV announced that Baumgartl's loan at Union had been extended through the 2022-23 season.

Career statistics

References

External links
 

1996 births
Living people
German footballers
Footballers from Baden-Württemberg
Association football defenders
Bundesliga players
2. Bundesliga players
3. Liga players
Eredivisie players
VfB Stuttgart II players
VfB Stuttgart players
PSV Eindhoven players
1. FC Union Berlin players
Germany youth international footballers
Germany under-21 international footballers
German expatriate footballers
Expatriate footballers in the Netherlands
People from Böblingen
Sportspeople from Stuttgart (region)
21st-century German people